Dodge Island is an artificial island near downtown Miami, Florida, United States. The Port of Miami is located on Dodge Island and has berths for both cruise and cargo ships.

The original and much smaller Dodge Island was created during the dredging of Government Cut in the early 1900s. According to The Miami News, the island went unnamed until 1950 when Mr and Mrs Ray Dodge of Wisconsin, friends of Frank Stearns, director of the City of Miami Planning Board, were visiting and asked what the island was called and, "unable to come up with a name of the island ... Stearns gave the parcel of land its present name." The current island was formed by further filling which combined Dodge Island with two other man-made islands, Lummus Island and Sam's Island.

Geography
It is located in Biscayne Bay between Miami and Miami Beach.

See also
Port of Miami
Port Boulevard
Port of Miami Tunnel

References

Islands of Miami
Islands of Miami-Dade County, Florida
Port of Miami